Love Story is an album by Tony Bennett, released in 1971. The album reached a peak position of number 67 on the Billboard 200. The album was conducted and arranged by Dick Hyman, Marion Evans, Marty Manning, Ralph Burns and Torrie Zito.

Track listing
 "Love Story" (Carl Sigman, Francis Lai) - 3:12
 "Tea for Two" (Vincent Youmans, Irving Caesar) - 2:54
 "I Want to Be Happy" (Youmans, Caesar) 3:11
 "Individual Thing" (Jule Styne, Bob Merrill) - 3:29
 "I Do Not Know a Day I Did Not Love You" (Richard Rodgers, Martin Charnin) - 3:27
 "They Can't Take That Away from Me" (George Gershwin, Ira Gershwin) - 2:47
 "When Joanna Loved Me" (Robert Wells, Jack Segal) - 3:39
 "Country Girl" (Robert Farnon) - 2:10
 "The Gentle Rain" (Luiz Bonfa, Matt Dubey) - 3:41
 "Soon It's Gonna Rain" (Tom Jones, Harvey Schmidt) - 3:41
 "A Taste of Honey" (Ric Marlow, Bobby Scott) - 2:55
 "I'll Begin Again" (Leslie Bricusse) - 3:48

References

1971 albums
Tony Bennett albums
Albums conducted by Ralph Burns
Albums arranged by Ralph Burns
Albums produced by Teo Macero
Columbia Records albums